The Francois Vertefeuille House is located in the Town of Prairie du Chien, Wisconsin, United States. It was added to the National Register of Historic Places in 1993. It is one of the oldest buildings in Wisconsin, and is designated as the oldest building in the state still located on its original site.

History
The house was built between 1810 and 1820 using the pièce-sur-pièce à coulisse technique common in French-Canadian buildings of the time. It was expanded during the 1820s after it was bought by Francois Vertefeuille, who had originally moved to Prairie du Chien from The Canadas in 1809.

See also
List of the oldest buildings in Wisconsin

References

French-Canadian culture in Wisconsin
Houses in Crawford County, Wisconsin
Houses on the National Register of Historic Places in Wisconsin
Log houses in the United States
Prairie du Chien, Wisconsin
National Register of Historic Places in Crawford County, Wisconsin
Log buildings and structures on the National Register of Historic Places in Wisconsin